393rd or 393d may refer to:

393d Bomb Squadron (393 BS) is part of the 509th Bomb Wing at Whiteman Air Force Base, Missouri
393d Bombardment Group, inactive United States Air Force unit
393d Bombardment Squadron (Medium) (1942), inactive United States Air Force unit
393d Fighter Squadron or 179th Fighter Squadron, unit of the Minnesota Air National Guard 148th Fighter Wing located at Duluth Air National Guard Base, Minnesota
393rd (Hampshire) Heavy Anti-Aircraft Regiment, Royal Artillery or 1st Hampshire Engineers, formed in 1862 responsible for the port defences of the South Coast of England
393rd Infantry Regiment (United States), U.S. Army Reserve regiment that is assigned to 75th Infantry Division (Training Support)

See also
393 (number)
393, the year 393 (CCCXCIII) of the Julian calendar
393 BC